In Oklahoma, State Highway 134 may refer to:
Oklahoma State Highway 134 (1958), now US 385
Oklahoma State Highway 134 (1963), now SH 325